Progress M1-10, identified by NASA as Progress 11P, was a Progress spacecraft used to resupply the International Space Station. It was a Progress-M1 11F615A55 spacecraft, with the serial number 259.

Launch
Progress M1-10 was launched by a Soyuz-U carrier rocket from Site 1/5 at the Baikonur Cosmodrome. Launch occurred at 10:34 UTC on 8 June 2003.

Docking
The spacecraft docked with the Pirs module at 11:14:53 UTC on 11 June 2003. It remained docked for 85 days before undocking at 19:41:44 UTC on 4 September 2003 to make way for Soyuz TMA-3. Following undocking, it remained in orbit for a month, conducting an earth observation mission. It was deorbited at 11:26 UTC on 3 October 2003, burning up in the atmosphere over the Pacific Ocean, with any remaining debris landing in the ocean at around 12:38:49 UTC.

Progress M1-10 carried supplies to the International Space Station, including food, water and oxygen for the crew and equipment for conducting scientific research.

See also

 List of Progress flights
 Uncrewed spaceflights to the International Space Station

References

Spacecraft launched in 2003
Progress (spacecraft) missions
Supply vehicles for the International Space Station
Spacecraft launched by Soyuz-U rockets
Spacecraft which reentered in 2003